Heterocompsa seabrai is a species of beetle in the family Cerambycidae. It was described by Martins in 1962.

References

Neoibidionini
Beetles described in 1962